TVNorge (literally "TVNorway"; originally abbreviated TVN, now just abbreviated N in the logos) is a Norwegian television channel owned by Warner Bros. Discovery EMEA.

History 

TVNorge went on the air on 5 December 1988 and was the first advertising-supported Norwegian channel. The channel was started with 50 000 NOK. The first broadcast was a live variety show from Oslo Cabaret with Swedish singer Lill-Babs and Norwegian pop group Tomboy as musical guests. Originally TVNorge broadcast via satellite and cable, later they have affiliated several local television broadcasters. The local broadcasters generally were allowed the 17.30-18.30 timeslot for local programming, along with a second slot from 19.30-20.30. The rest of the time was assigned to TVNorge's own schedule.

The channel was styled as TVN until 1995, following a rebrand that year, it became TVNorge.

TVNorge became successful early on, before the launch of TV 2, owing to the success of game shows like Casino and Starshot.

When the last analogue terrestrial television transmitter closed in December 2009, the agreement with the local broadcasters and TVNorge ended. TVNorge now broadcasts via private cable and satellite providers in addition to RiksTV, which is the Norwegian digital terrestrial television distributor.

TVNorge and the rest of the SBS Broadcasting group was wholly owned by ProSiebenSat.1 Media AG, but was sold to Discovery Communications on 14 December 2012.

In 2003, Novell sued TVNorge at The Court of Enforcement (Namsretten) and asked for a temporary injunction against TVNorge as they found the logo too similar to their own. Novell did not seem to proceed to a full court case after losing their case there.

In 2013, the variety group Ylvis created a promo music video for their program on TVNorge entitled The Fox, which became a surprise internet hit and brought international attention to the channel.

As of 2018, TVNorge is also involved in broadcasting the Olympic Games alongside sister network Eurosport.

High Definition 

TVNorge launched Norway's first High Definition simulcast on their main channel on 3 October 2008, and starting in 2009 TVNorge broadcast own productions in HD. The first episodes shown in HD was the HBO series Rome, and the channel has included several other imported series like CSI, CSI: Miami, CSI: NY and The Big Bang Theory. The HD station has the same schedule as the SD station. Broadcasts not available in high definition are broadcast in standard definition.

See also 
 List of Norwegian television channels
 List of programs broadcast by TVNorge
 TVNorge HD

References

External links 
 Official Site
 TVNorge Television Schedule

 
Television channels in Norway
Television channels and stations established in 1988
1988 establishments in Norway
Warner Bros. Discovery networks
Warner Bros. Discovery EMEA